Heather Kozar (born May 4, 1976) is an American glamour model known as Playboys Playmate of the Month for January 1998 and Playmate of the Year for 1999, and for her work on the game show The Price Is Right.

Early life
Heather Kozar was born in Akron, Ohio. She grew up in Green, Ohio, and graduated from Green High School in 1994.

Career
In 1998 Kozar became Playboy magazine's Playmate of the Month for January 1998, appearing in both the monthly nude photo spread and a series of Playboy videos. She was voted Playmate of the Year for 1999 and appeared on the cover of the June 1999 issue of the magazine. Her original centerfold was photographed by Richard Fegley.

In 2001, Kozar became a Barker's Beauty model for the CBS daytime game show The Price Is Right. She was eventually fired from the show, according to Fremantle Media, the show's production company, because it led to appearances in an increasing number of high-paying television commercials and other assignments, and some of these conflicted with the show's production schedule. Fremantle Media executive Syd Vinnedge praised Kozar, saying, "I've been delighted with the contribution [Kozar] made to our show. We're pleased when our models can use appearances on The Price Is Right as a steppingstone."

In 2002, Kozar was the St Pauli Girl, the spokesmodel for the beer of the same name. She also appears in some of Jeff Koons's paintings, including "Elvis", "Triple Elvis", and "Quad Elvis" (2008).

Kozar's image has appeared in Jeff Koons paintings, including "Triple Elvis" (2007) and "Peg Leg Double Elvis" (2009).

Kozar modeled for companies such as Brut cologne, BMW, Wendy's, and Cutty Sark Scots Whisky.

In 2009 Boston.com ranked Kozar, who had married Cleveland Browns quarterback Tim Couch, No. 5 in its list of the "Ten prettiest NFL girlfriends and wives".

Personal life
By 2000, Kozar had dated Cleveland Browns quarterback Tim Couch. In 2005 they married. As of 2019, they divorced. They have two sons together and live in Lexington, Kentucky.

Filmography
Back Home Again, Madison, 2004
The Price Is Right, Herself, 2001–2002 (213 episodes)
WWE Smackdown!, Herself, 1999
Shasta McNasty, Playmate Cindy, 1999

References

External links

1976 births
Living people
Game show models
1990s Playboy Playmates
Playboy Playmates of the Year
People from Akron, Ohio
People from Green, Ohio